Facciolella castlei is an eel in the family Nettastomatidae (duckbill/witch eels). It was described by Nikolai Vasilyevich Parin and Emma Stanislavovna Karmovskaya in 1985. It is a marine, deep water-dwelling eel which is known from Chile, in the southeastern Pacific Ocean. The type specimen was retrieved from a depth of 230 metres.

References

Nettastomatidae
Fish described in 1985
Endemic fauna of Chile